Frankie Nolan (born 1950) is a former Irish sportsperson.  He played hurling with his local club Patrickswell and with the Limerick senior inter-county team in the 1970s. He won an All Ireland medal in 1973 and was on the losing side n the final in 1974. He has the distinction of opening the scoring, with points from play, in both finals. He won three Munster Medals in 73,74 and 81, as a sub.

Career statistics

References 

1950 births
Living people
Patrickswell hurlers
Limerick inter-county hurlers
Munster inter-provincial hurlers
All-Ireland Senior Hurling Championship winners